Jozef Gönci  (born 18 March 1974, in Košice) is a Slovak sport shooter, specialising in the 50 m Rifle and 10 m Air Rifle. Gönci won independent Slovakia's first ever Olympic Medal, a bronze in Atlanta in 1996. He won another bronze medal eight years later at the 2004 Olympic Games in Athens.

References

External links 
  Gönci's profile at ISSF NEWS

1974 births
Living people
Sportspeople from Košice
ISSF rifle shooters
Slovak male sport shooters
Olympic bronze medalists for Slovakia
Olympic shooters of Slovakia
Shooters at the 1996 Summer Olympics
Shooters at the 2000 Summer Olympics
Shooters at the 2004 Summer Olympics
Shooters at the 2008 Summer Olympics
Shooters at the 2012 Summer Olympics
Olympic medalists in shooting
Medalists at the 2004 Summer Olympics
Medalists at the 1996 Summer Olympics